Zhezkazgan Airport ( / ; IATA: DZN, ICAO: UAKD) is an international airport, serving the city of Zhezkazgan in Ulytau Region of Kazakhstan.

At the moment, it has one asphalt and concrete runway, and other four unpaved runways. The pavement classification number is 37/R/B/X/T.

In 2015, 29,518 passengers have gone through the airport, and in 2016 this number fell to 26,624 people.

History 

Often, airport couldn't operate flights due to its runways getting wet because of rain or melting snow in the spring, what has led to canceling flights.

New, currently operating airport with an asphalt-concrete runway was built in 1971–1973, and in 1985, a new terminal was built, which could serve up to 200 passengers per hour.

The first flight, operated by the new airport, was done by an Ilyushin Il-18 airplane. In the 1970s, Zhezkazgan United Air Squadron (Russian: Джезказганская объединённая авиаэскадрилья) was formed in the airport. In 1983 it started using L-410 planes in commercial purposes, and in 1995 it has got two Mi-8 helicopters.

Zhezkazgan Air (Russian: "Жезказган Эйр") airline was formed in the airport in October 1996.

In 2004, the airport has received a reconstruction of its terminal and the runway, as well as an upgrade of its equipment. This was made possible with the financial support from Kazakhmys Corporation, a copper mining company.

In 2008, the airport was declared international after a decree from the government of Kazakhstan.

Used aircraft 

 Antonov An-12
 Antonov An-24
 Antonov An-26
 Ilyushin Il-76
 Tupolev Tu-134
 Tupolev Tu-154
 Yakovlev Yak-40
 Yakovlev Yak-42
 Bombardier CRJ100/200
 Bombardier Q400
 Embraer EMB 120 Brasilia
 Boeing 737

Airlines and destinations

Accidents 

During the flight over the snowy terrain on an altitude, that was lower than the safe one, the crew lost visual contact with the ground. Aircraft commander has died immediately; the second pilot was found alive and was evacuated by a helicopter into a hospital, where he died on 13 January 1987. Search and rescue operations were complicated by difficult weather conditions (a blizzard, heavy wind and low cloudiness).

References

External links
 
 

Airports in Kazakhstan